The second season of The Real Housewives of New Jersey, an American reality television series, was broadcast on Bravo. It aired from May 3, 2010 until September 6, 2010, and was primarily filmed in Franklin Lakes, New Jersey. Its executive producers are Rebecca Toth Diefenbach, Valerie Haselton, Lucilla D'Agostino, Jim Fraenkel, Omid Kahangi, Caroline Self, Tess Gamboa Meyers and Andy Cohen.

The Real Housewives of New Jersey focuses on the lives of Teresa Giudice, Jacqueline Laurita, Caroline Manzo, Dina Manzo and Danielle Staub. It consisted of eighteen episodes.

Production and crew
With the success of the first season averaging 2.55 million total viewers, Bravo announced the renewal of the second season on October 6, 2009. The season premiere "Water Under the Table" was aired on May 10, 2010, while the sixteenth episode "The Heads of Family Will Roll" served as the season finale, and was aired on August 23, 2010. It was followed by a two-part reunion which marked the conclusion of the season and was broadcast on August 30 and September 6, 2010. Rebecca Toth Diefenbach, Valerie Haselton, Lucilla D'Agostino, Jim Fraenkel, Omid Kahangi, Caroline Self, Tess Gamboa Meyers and Andy Cohen are recognized as the series' executive producers; it is produced and distributed by Sirens Media.

Cast and synopsis

The second season saw no regular cast changes made at the beginning of the series. The season begins where the first ended- Danielle being on the outs with the other ladies and still trying to intercept the inner-circle. Throughout the series the cast continues to fight with Danielle and continue to unite with one another as friends and family. In episode 7, "Play at Your Own Risk", it saw Dina Manzo departing from the series to get rid of Danielle and spend more time with her family.

 Dina Manzo does not appear at this reunion.

Episodes

 denotes a "super-sized" 75-minute episode (with advertisements; actual runtime around 55 minutes).

References

External links

2010 American television seasons
New Jersey (season 2)